Sagat is a given name and surname. Notable people with the name include:

Given name
Sagat Abikeyeva (born 1981), Kazakhstani judoka
Sagat Petchyindee, Thai kickboxer
Sagat Singh (1918–2001), Indian general

Surname
François Sagat (born 1979), French male pornographic actor and model
Martin Šagát, Slovak ice hockey player
Serhat Sağat (born 1983), Turkish footballer

See also
Saget, surname